The Hills' horseshoe bat (Rhinolophus hillorum) is a species of bat in the family Rhinolophidae. It is found in Cameroon, Guinea, Liberia, and Nigeria. Its natural habitats are subtropical and tropical moist lowland and montane forest, caves and other subterranean habitats.

Taxonomy
Hills' horseshoe bat was first described as a new subspecies of Geoffroy's horseshoe bat with a trinomen of Rhinolophus clivosus hillorum in 1989. The holotype had been collected near Voinjama, Liberia. It was first recognized as a full species in 2002. The eponyms for the species name "hillorum" were the unrelated mammalogists John Eric Hill and John Edwards Hill.

Description

Range and habitat
Hills' horseshoe bat is found in Western and Central Africa, where it has been confirmed in Cameroon, Guinea, Liberia, Nigeria. Its presence is possible yet unconfirmed in Uganda as of 2010.

Conservation
As of 2022, it is evaluated as vulnerable by the IUCN. It meets the criteria for this classification because it is experiencing habitat destruction. It likely has a small population size which is also declining. Specific threats this species faces include mining, quarrying, deforestation, and hunting.

References

Rhinolophidae
Taxonomy articles created by Polbot
Mammals described in 1989
Bats of Africa